James Henry Madison (born February 17, 1947, Cincinnati) is an American jazz drummer who was considered a child prodigy.

Madison grew up in a musical family and was playing drums in public by age twelve. In 1966 he worked in Ohio with Don Goldie, then toured with Lionel Hampton. He worked both in Cincinnati and New York in the late 1960s; by 1969 he had joined Marian McPartland in New York, working with her until 1972. In the 1970s he also worked with James Brown, Bobby Hackett, Joe Farrell, David Matthews, Roland Kirk, Carmen McRae, Harold Danko, Chet Baker, Urbie Green, Michel Legrand, Don Sebesky, George Benson, Nina Simone, Lee Konitz, Hod O'Brien, Art Farmer, and Mark Murphy. He also worked as a record producer for his own studio.

As a leader, Madison led a small ensemble starting in the 1970s; his sidemen rotated over time but at times included Tom Harrell, Harold Danko, Phil Markowitz, Larry Schneider, Andy LaVerne, Dan Wall, Mike Richmond, Bill Evans, Kenny Barron, Dennis Irwin, Gene Perla, Manhattan Jazz Quintet  and Jon Burr. He also led a big band in the early 1980s in New York. His associations as a sideman in the 1980s included Ron McClure, Janet Lawson, Chip Jackson, Ricky Ford, Jack Walrath, David Schnitter, Paul Nash, and Stanley Turrentine. In the 1990s he played with Maceo Parker, Red Rodney aka Albino Red, Chris Potter, Tarik Shah, and Steve Gilmore.

Discography

Jimmy Madison – Bumps On A Smooth Surface (Adelphi Records Inc. – AD 5007, 1978)

With Joe Farrell
Upon This Rock (CTI Records, 1974)
Canned Funk (CTI Records, 1975)
With Carmen McRae
Ms. Jazz (Groove Merchant, 1974)
With Mark Murphy 
Bridging a Gap (Muse, 1972)
With Jack Walrath
In Europe (SteepleChase, 1982)
Wholly Trinity (Muse, 1986 [1988])

References

Gary W. Kennedy, "Jimmy Madison". The New Grove Dictionary of Jazz. 2nd edition, ed. Barry Kernfeld.

American jazz drummers
1947 births
Living people
Jazz musicians from Ohio
Musicians from Cincinnati